Mahamadou Sidibé (born 8 October 1978) is a Malian former professional footballer who played as a goalkeeper. He spent the majority of his career in Greece.

Career
Born in Bamako, Mali, Sidibé began his career at Real Bamako. His first club abroad was Egyptian club El Qanah FC. Following a stint in Saudi Arabia with Al Ahli Saudi FC he continued his career in Greece where played for PAS Giannia, Egaleo, Athinaikos and  Ethnikos Achna FC. In June 2009, Sidibé joined AC Omonia of Cyprus as a third selection goalkeeper.

Sidibé played 97 international matches for the Mali national team.

Honours
Omonia
Cypriot Championship: 2010

References

External links
FIFA profile

1978 births
Living people
Sportspeople from Bamako
Malian footballers
Association football goalkeepers
Mali international footballers
2002 African Cup of Nations players
2004 African Cup of Nations players
2008 Africa Cup of Nations players
2010 Africa Cup of Nations players
Super League Greece players
Cypriot First Division players
AS Real Bamako players
El Qanah FC players
Athinaikos F.C. players
A.O. Kerkyra players
PAS Giannina F.C. players
Egaleo F.C. players
Ethnikos Achna FC players
AC Omonia players
21st-century Malian people
Malian expatriate footballers
Malian expatriate sportspeople in Egypt
Expatriate footballers in Egypt
Malian expatriate sportspeople in Saudi Arabia
Expatriate footballers in Saudi Arabia
Malian expatriate sportspeople in Greece
Expatriate footballers in Greece
Malian expatriate sportspeople in Cyprus
Expatriate footballers in Cyprus